This is a list of the top 50 singles in 2007 in New Zealand, as listed by the Recording Industry Association of New Zealand (RIANZ).

Chart
Key
 – Song of New Zealand origin

Notes

External links
 The Official NZ Music Chart, RIANZ website

2007 in New Zealand music
2007 record charts
Singles 2007